Danielle Laraque-Arena is an American pediatrician, academician and administrator. She is currently a senior scholar-in-residence at the New York Academy of Medicine. Prior to her role at the academy, she was a professor at Einstein College and the Mount Sinai School of Medicine, as well as chair of the pediatrics department at Maimonides Medical Center. From 2016 to 2018, Laraque-Arena served as president of State University of New York Upstate Medical University, succeeding Gregory Eastwood as the first woman to be president. In that role, she also served as CEO of the Upstate Health System. 

Laraque-Arena was born in Haiti and moved with her family to the United States in the early 1960s. She graduated from the University of California, Los Angeles with a medical doctorate; she then fulfilled a postdoctoral internship and residency at the Children's Hospital of Philadelphia. She has spent most of her career in New York City.

Early life and education
Danielle Laraque-Arena was born along with two brothers in Port-au-Prince, Haiti, daughter of Paul and Marcelle Laraque. Her grandparents ran a pharmacy, and her grandfather was a physician. Her father was a poet, activist, and critic of Haitian president François Duvalier. He fled Haiti for Spain in 1960 when Duvalier's police were targeting political dissidents. He moved to the United States in 1961; Marcelle joined him in 1962, and their children and a grandmother joined them soon afterward, when Danielle was 7 years old. The family lived in Queens in New York City. There her father initially worked as a parking attendant at New York University and her mother became a clerk at the United Nations. Her father took night classes to earn a bachelor's degree and took a job at Fordham Preparatory School, teaching Latin and Spanish. Because of the job, Danielle and her brother attended the related Fordham University for free. She spent her third year at the University of Leeds in England, and finished her fourth year and earned a bachelor's degree in chemistry in 1976 at the University of California at Los Angeles (UCLA). She then received a full scholarship to UCLA's medical school, where she earned a medical doctorate. During this time, she worked at Martin Luther King Jr. Community Hospital in Watts, which served Watts and Compton, both poor areas of greater Los Angeles. Afterward, she underwent a postdoctoral internship and residency at the Children's Hospital of Philadelphia.

Career
In the mid-1980s, she joined Columbia University's faculty, where she worked at Harlem Hospital during the US's AIDS epidemic. There she developed three teams to evaluate and treat abused and neglected children. From 2000 to 2010, she worked as professor of pediatrics and of preventative medicine at Mount Sinai School of Medicine, and was the chief of the general pediatrics division, as well as vice-chair of public policy and advocacy there. She later became a professor of pediatrics at the Einstein College of Medicine, part of Yeshiva University.

Laraque-Arena served as chair of the pediatrics department and a vice president of Maimonides Medical Center. She was president of State University of New York Upstate Medical University (Upstate) from January 2016 to 2018, succeeding Gregory Eastwood as the first woman to be president.

Personal life
Laraque-Arena is married to Luigi Arena, a retired radiologist. The two had met while Laraque-Arena was a freshman at Fordham; Luigi Arena was a Fulbright Scholar from Italy earning a master's degree in New York. They have two adult children, Marc Anthony and Julia Marie.

Selected works

References

Living people
Date of birth missing (living people)
People from Port-au-Prince
Yeshiva University faculty
State University of New York Upstate Medical University faculty
American pediatricians
Women pediatricians
Presidents of campuses of the State University of New York
1956 births
David Geffen School of Medicine at UCLA alumni